The  Canada lunar sample displays  are two commemorative plaques consisting of small fragments of Moon specimen brought back with the Apollo 11 and Apollo 17 lunar missions and given in the 1970s to the people of Canada by United States President Richard Nixon as goodwill gifts.

Description

Apollo 11

Apollo 17

History 

In 1972 Jaymie Matthews was given the Canadian "goodwill Moon rock". It was displayed at the National Museum of Natural Sciences in Ottawa for several years. It went missing between 1978 and 2000, and was then housed at the Canada Science and Technology Museum in Ottawa.

See also
 List of Apollo lunar sample displays

References

Further reading

External links
 Partial list of Apollo 11, 12, 14, 15, 16, and 17 sample locations, NASA Johnson Space Center

Stolen and missing moon rocks
Canada–United States relations
Science and technology in Canada